Attorney General Reed may refer to:

Joseph Reed (lawyer) (1772–1846), Attorney General of Pennsylvania
Thomas Brackett Reed (1839–1902), Attorney General of Maine
William Bradford Reed (1806–1876), Attorney General of Pennsylvania
Thomas Buck Reed (1787–1829), Attorney General of Mississippi
Chester I. Reed (1823–1873), Attorney General of Massachusetts
Frederick M. Reed (1924–2012), Attorney General of Vermont

See also
Thomas Read (politician) (1881–1962), Attorney General of Michigan
Attorney General Reid (disambiguation)
General Reed (disambiguation)